Jan Achacy Kmita (died 27 August 1624 or sometime in 1628) was a Polish poet and translator from Bochnia.

Kmita translated Virgil's Aeneid and Eclogues (1591, 1588) and was particularly well known for his funerary poetry, including Treny na Śmierć Katarzyny Barnickiey Starościny Niepołomickiey (Cracow, 1588) and Łów Dyjanny (1588). His other writings included  Żywoty Królów polskich (1591); Spitamegeranomachia (1595), a mock-heroic work about the wars of Stefan Batory; and a prefatory poem in Simon Syrenius's Zielnik (1613).

Kmita served in Stefan Bathory's Livonian Wars, and later in life was a member of the Babin Republic.

In addition to his literary activities, Kmita served as podżupnik (administrator) of the Bochnia Salt Mine.

Works

Anti-semitic writings
 Seper = Ein send Breief, abo list od Zydow Polskich, Po Messyasza: Ktory iako Zydzi wierzą w Raiu siedzi, czekaiąc czasu przyścia swego. Cracow(?), 1601.  
Proces sprawy Bocheńskiey. 1610.
Talmud Abo Wiara Zydowska. Cracow: 1610; Lublin: Anna Konradowa, 1642.
Ierycho Nowe. 1615.
Akatergaston To iest Vtracenie ozdoby Ciała żywego Zacnie Vrodzonego Pana Spytka Stanisława Faliboga z Ianowic... Cracow, after 10 March 1622.
Peszach Hoc est Pascha Siue Transitus a Vitiis Ad Summos Apices Virtutem et Religionem. 1623.
Kruk w złotey klatce abo Żydzi w świebodney wolności Korony Polskiey. 2nd ed., Cracow, 1648.

Poetry
Funerary poetry
Łów Dyjanny.  Cracow: Mikołaj Scharffenberg, 1588.
 A paraphrase of Ad Ascanium cardinalem S. Viti Venatio by Adrian da Corneto (1505).
Threny na smierć jey mości Paniey Katarzyny Branickiey, Starościney Niepołomskiey &c. Cracow(?): Mikołaj Scharffenberg(?), after 8 October 1588.
Treny bardzo smutne na zeszcie z tego świata .. pana imei książęcia Janusza Zbaraskiego, wojewody bracławskiego, starosty krzemienieckiego. Cracow, 1608. 
Treny bardzo smutne na pogrzebie Anny Mińskiej. Cracow, 1609. 
Salicernium na pogrzeb Pawła Czernego z Wilowie. Cracow, 1610. 
 Apotheosis starożytney familiey nieboszczyka Swięey Pamięi księdza Woyciecha Szydłowskiego... Cracow: Bazyli Skalski, 1617.
 Osculum mortis praeclara nobilitate. Cracow, 1621. 
 For the death of Krzysztof z Bogoryi Podłeski.
 Monodia abo pocałowanie śmierci. Cracow, 1622. 
 For the death of Helżbieta of Sienna.
 Threny na śmierć syna Jana Chwaliboga, rotmisztrza powiatowego. Cracow, 1624.

Other poems
 Jana Szemeta Trymachia. Cracow: drukarnia Łazarzowa, 1584. 
 Psalma przyjazdu szcześliwego... Zygmunta Trzeciego. Kraków, 1587. 
 Dedicated to Olbracht Łaski, Palatine of Sieradz.
Spitamegeranomachia. 1595. Repr. in Biblioteka pisarzów polskich. Cracow, 1897.
 ...S.R.M. Simbola officialium [et] officiorum famulorumq[ue] zupp[a]e Bochnen[sis] nec non regum [et] zuppariorum inclutorum non null[a]e antiquitates. Cracow: Szymon Kempini, 1605.
Fenix poema. Cracow, 1609. 
 Monogamia Iego Mosci Pana Mikołaia Stradomskiego, y [...] Katharzyny Pszomkowny [...] Iakvba Pszomki [...] Corki. Cracow, 1617.
 Includes Morocosmea Babińskie and Epitaphium D. Psomkae fundatoris Soc. Babinensis.

Translations
 Virgil. Pasterskie Publiusza Wergiliusza Marona rozmowy (Eclogues). Cracow, 1588. 
 Dedicated to  Grzegorz Branicki z Branic, starosta of Niepołomice.
 Maffeo Vegio. O Eneaszu Trojańskim księgi trzynaste. Cracow, 1591. Repr. in Biblioteka pisarzów polskich. Cracow, 1897.
Penelopea, abo niewinność cudowney niewiasty. 1610. Repr. in Biblioteka pisarzów polskich. Cracow, 1897.
Symaryjusz przypowieści Salomonowych skomplikowany. Cracow, 1622; Cracow: drukarnia u Alexandra Dynowskiego, 1630.
Żywoty królów polskich. Cracow: Mikołaj Scharffenberg, 1591.
 Translation of Klemens Janicki's Vitae regum Polonorum (1563).

Other works
Summaryjusz przypowieści Salomonowych zkompilowany. Cracow: u Sebastyjana Tabrowica, 1622; 2nd. ed., Cracow: u Alexandra Dymowskiego, 1630. 
O Confederaciey Lwowskiey w Roku 1622 uczynioney nauka za Pozwoleniem Urzędowym Wydana: Multis Simul Criminibus Obruitur qui Contra Patriam Peccat: Impietate, Ingratudine, Ciuium Perturbatione, Ac Matricidi. Cracow: Franciszek Cezary, after 1622. Repr. 1858.
Poczatki Krolow Rzymskich. Cracow: drukarnia Łazarzowa, n.d.
Obyczaje tureckie i sposoby ich pożycia, przez sławnego niegdyś i nieszczęśliwego pielgrzyma jerozolimskiego Bartłmieja Jurgiewicza opisane... Cracow, n.d.
 Zwierciadło korony polskiej. n.d.

References
Notes

Bibliography
 Cytowska, M. “U źródeł Łowu Dyjanny Jana Achacego Kmity.” Meander XVII, no. 4 (1962): 215-23. 
Michałowska-Mycielska, Anna. “Jan Achacy Kmita: An Anti-Jewish Writer of the First Half of the 17th Century.” Scripta Judaica Cracoviensia: Studia z historii, kultury i religii żydów 4 (2006): 11–15.
 Pepłowski, F. “Vitae regum Polonorum Klemensa Janickiego w przekładzie Jana Achacego Kmity.” Pamiętnik Literacki LXXI, vol. 4 (1980), 201-215.
 Ślaski, Jan. “Jan Achacy Kmita a literatura włoska: (kilka rysów do portretu wierszopisa z pogranicza renesansu i baroku)” Przegląd Humanistyczny 5/6 (224/225) (1984): 61-79.
 Teter, Magda. Anti-Jewish Accusations in Poland: A Medieval or Early Modern Phenomenon? Early Modern Jewries, 2004, Wesleyan University, Middletown, CT
 Włodarski, M. “Walka Pigmejów z żurawiami. Na tropie utworu poprzedzającego poemat Jana Achacego Kmity,” Ruch Literacki XVI, no. 5 (1975): 323-26. 
 Wójcicki, Jacek. “‘Początki Królów Rzymskich’ Jana Achacego Kmity Przekładem?” Napis: Pismo Poświęcone Literaturze Okolicznościowej i Użytkowej 4 (1988): 19–36.

1624 deaths
16th-century Latin-language writers
17th-century Polish historians
Polish male non-fiction writers
Polish male writers
Year of birth unknown
Translators of Virgil
16th-century Polish historians